Ashley Jini Park (born June 6, 1991) is an American actress, dancer, and singer. She is best known for her portrayal of Mindy Chen on Netflix's Emily in Paris, which garnered her a Critics' Choice Award nomination, and for originating the role of Gretchen Wieners in the 2018 Tony Award-nominated musical Mean Girls, for which she received Drama Desk Award and Tony Award nominations. Her theatre roles also include Tuptim in the 2015 Broadway revival of The King and I and MwE in Ars Nova's KPOP Off-Broadway.

Early life and education
Park was born in Glendale, California, and grew up in Ann Arbor, Michigan.<ref>{{cite web |last=Franklin |first=Marc J. |date=August 7, 2018 |title=Visit the Farmers Market With Mean Girls''' Ashley Park |url=http://www.playbill.com/article/visit-the-farmers-market-with-mean-girls-ashley-park |url-status=live |archive-url=https://web.archive.org/web/20220126172741/https://www.playbill.com/article/visit-the-farmers-market-with-mean-girls-ashley-park |archive-date=January 26, 2022 |access-date= |website=Playbill }}</ref> Her parents are Andrew and Sara Park, and she has a younger sister, Audrey. She is of Korean descent, and is a second cousin of actor Justin H. Min.

Park was placed in dance classes at the Oceanside Dance Academy at age three and began piano lessons at age five. Park's love of performing led her to participate in Ann Arbor's community kids’ theatre throughout middle school and high school. She also attended Interlochen Summer Arts Camp in 2003. Park attended Pioneer High School where she participated in both theatre and choir. She also co-founded a women's a cappella group at Pioneer High School, Soulfege, which placed second at a national competition in 2009.

During her sophomore year in high school, at age 15, Park was diagnosed with acute myeloid leukemia and was hospitalized for eight months. Park was a recipient of a "wish" from the Make-A-Wish Foundation for which she and her family went to New York City and saw the Broadway productions of A Chorus Line, The Lion King, Spring Awakening, and Wicked. In interviews she has stated, "My cancer experience is, I think, the reason I do theater...As soon as I was out of the hospital, all I wanted to do is be around people." After chemotherapy, Park returned to high school, and three months later, she was cast as the lead role of Millie Dillmount in her high school's production of Thoroughly Modern Millie. Park has disclosed that during this time, “putting on a wig and putting on shoes and costume and being a different person was the best escape from being just the girl who had cancer”.

She graduated from Pioneer High School in 2009 and then attended the University of Michigan, earning a BFA in musical theatre from the School of Music, Theater, and Dance in 2013. During her undergraduate years, she co-founded the Michigan Performance Outreach Workshop (MPOW).

Career
In the summer of 2009, Park was cast as Yvonne and an ensemble member in the Music Theatre Wichita production of Miss Saigon in Wichita, Kansas. Park spent the next two summer seasons performing in various productions at the Benedum Center in Pittsburgh, Pennsylvania, with the Pittsburgh Civic Light Opera during which she earned her Equity card.

Park made her Broadway debut as a member of the ensemble in Mamma Mia! at the Broadhurst Theatre on February 17, 2014. She left the production on September 21, 2014. From October 2014 to January 2015, Park portrayed Gabrielle in the original U.S. national touring company of Rodgers + Hammerstein's Cinderella.

Park then returned to Broadway on April 16, 2015, in her first leading role as Tuptim in the 2015 revival of The King and I at the Vivian Beaumont Theater and remained with the production until its closing on June 26, 2016. Park was featured as a principal soloist on the cast recording for which she was nominated for a Grammy Award.

In February 2017, she appeared in the Broadway revival of Sunday in the Park with George as Celeste #1 and Theresa alongside Jake Gyllenhaal, Annaleigh Ashford, and Ruthie Ann Miles.

In the fall of 2017, Park portrayed MwE in the off-Broadway musical KPOP at the Ars Nova. She was nominated for a Drama Desk Award and a Drama League Award and also won a Lucille Lortel Award for this role. Park left the production in October 2017 due to her beginning rehearsals for the Mean Girls out-of-town tryout and was replaced by Marina Kondo.

Park starred as Gretchen Wieners in the Tony Award-nominated Broadway musical Mean Girls, written by Tina Fey with music and lyrics by Jeff Richmond and Nell Benjamin, respectively. The show had its world premiere as an out-of-town tryout at the National Theatre in Washington, D.C., from October 31, 2017, to December 3, 2017, in which Park originated the role of Gretchen Wieners. The musical, which is based on the film of the same name, began previews on March 12, 2018, and officially opened on Broadway on April 8, 2018, at the August Wilson Theatre in New York City. Park received nominations for numerous awards for her role as Gretchen Wieners, including nominations for the Tony Award for Best Featured Actress in a Musical, a Drama League Award, and the Drama Desk Award for Outstanding Featured Actress in a Musical. In May 2018 Park was awarded the Clarence Derwent Award, an honor "given to the most promising female and male performers" in New York City, by the Actors’ Equity Foundation, along with Sean Carvajal. On March 10, 2019, Park left the production and was replaced by Krystina Alabado.

In June 2019, it was announced that Park would headline a "revamped" production of Thoroughly Modern Millie from May 6–10, 2020, for New York City Center Encores!. However, due to the COVID-19 pandemic, the production was cancelled, and ticket refunds were offered to the public.

Park was cast in August 2019 in the role of Mindy Chen in Netflix's Emily in Paris, opposite Lily Collins. The series premiered on October 2, 2020, and was renewed for a second season on November 11, 2020. Park's character covered "La Vie en Rose" in the first season of Emily in Paris. It was the most downloaded TV song for that week.

In October 2020 it was announced that Park would be heard as Kaye Fields in As the Curtain Rises, an original podcast soap opera from the Broadway Podcast Network.

On December 28, 2020, it was announced that Park would star as Colette in a benefit concert presentation of Ratatouille the Musical, an internet meme that originated on TikTok, inspired by the 2007 Disney/Pixar film. The concert streamed exclusively on TodayTix on January 1, 2021.

In August 2021, it was announced Park would star as Cinderella in the 2022 Encores! version of Into the Woods. She was ultimately replaced by Denée Benton.

Park is set to star in Crazy Rich Asians writer Adele Lim's directorial debut, Joy Ride. The R-rated comedy "follows four Asian American women as they travel through Asia in search of one of their birth mothers."

Philanthropy and activism
As a student at the University of Michigan, Park was the co-founder of the Michigan Performance Outreach Workshop (MPOW), a student-run organization with the purpose of bringing performing arts educational opportunities to students in southeastern Michigan to, "foster creative expression, build self-esteem, and strengthen the community." MPOW hosts an on-campus workshop each semester for 130-200 public-school students that includes performances by University of Michigan students as well as immersive and collaborative workshops in arts-based disciplines. In 2013 Park was awarded with the Willis Patterson Diversity Award for using her "talents and scholarly abilities to enhance the development of, and appreciation for, a more culturally and ethnically diverse community in the School of Music, Theatre & Dance" at the University of Michigan.

During her undergraduate years, Park was also involved with the Prison Creative Arts Project, an organization that engages "those impacted by the justice system into artistic collaboration" with University of Michigan students for "mutual learning and growth through theatre, dance, visual art, creative writing, slam poetry, and music" in Ann Arbor, Michigan.

Since moving to NYC, Park has participated in events supporting Broadway Cares/Equity Fights AIDS (BCEFA). In June 2018, she participated in the 28th annual Broadway Bares, an annual burlesque/striptease show fundraiser for BCEFA, and personally raised nearly $3,000 for the organization. In August 2018 Park participated in Covenant House's Stage & Screen Sleep Out along with Mean Girls co-stars Kyle Selig and Curtis Holland, and together they raised over $14,000 for the organization which provides shelter, food, and crisis care for the homeless and runaway youth.

She also has served as a mentor and held masterclasses for various programs and organizations, such as The Broadway Collective and Broadway Workshop.

During the COVID-19 pandemic, Park set up a second Instagram account from which she began offering ten-minute one-on-one lessons and daily question-and-answer sessions via Zoom in exchange for donations to the Actors Fund.

Theatre credits

† indicates a Broadway production

Filmography
Film

Television

Discography
Cast recordings
 The King and I - The 2015 Broadway Cast Recording (2015)
 Sunday in the Park with George - 2017 Broadway Cast Recording (2017)
 The Greatest Showman - Original Motion Picture Soundtrack (2017)
 Mean Girls - Original Broadway Cast Recording (2018)

Collaborative projects
 Broadway's Carols for a Cure, Volume 17 (2015)
 Broadway's Carols for a Cure, Volume 20 (2018)

As featured artist
 "Rockin' Around the Pole" by The Hot Elves (for Mean Girls) (2018)

Soundtrack
 Soundtrack from Emily in Paris (2021) - 5 songs

Podcasts
 As the Curtain Rises'' – Kaye Fields (voice acting role)

Awards and nominations

Special honors and awards
 2013 – Willis Patterson Diversity Award
 2018 – Clarence Derwent Award
 2019 – Cancer Support Community's Marin Mazzie Award for Empowerment

See also
 Koreans in New York City

References

Further reading

External links
 
 

1991 births
Living people
21st-century American actresses
American musical theatre actresses
American stage actresses
University of Michigan School of Music, Theatre & Dance alumni
Actresses from Glendale, California
Actors from Ann Arbor, Michigan
Actresses from Michigan
American actresses of Korean descent